Gopal Seth is an Indian politician belonging to All India Trinamool Congress. He was elected as MLA of Bongaon Vidhan Sabha Constituency in West Bengal Legislative Assembly in 2009. His father Bhupendranath Seth was elected as MLA of Bongaon Vidhan Sabha Constituency three times. Now he is a chairman of Bongaon Uttar Bidhansabha committee, All India Trinamool Congress. Now he is a chairman of Bangaon municipality and president of  Bongaon District Trinamool Congress.

References

Living people
Trinamool Congress politicians from West Bengal
Members of the West Bengal Legislative Assembly
1964 births